Rudra of Recherla (IAST: Recerla) family, also known as Rudra-senani, was a 12th-13th century military commander and administrator of the Kakatiya kingdom of present-day India. Around 1198 CE, the Kakatiya king Mahadeva was killed in a campaign against the Seunas (Yadavas), and his son Ganapati was captured by the enemy. Rudra administered the kingdom in name of Ganapati, and reinstated him on the throne after his release. Rudra established the Palampet town, and commissioned the Ramappa Temple there.

Military career 

Rudra served as the commander-in-chief of the Kakatiya army during the reign of the Kakatiya king Mahadeva. In 1198-1199 CE, Mahadeva was killed in a battle against the Seuna (Yadava) kingdom, and his son Ganapati was captured by the enemy.

During Ganapati's captivity, Rudra appears to have handled the administration in Ganapati's name, as suggested by his titles Kakatiya-rajya-bhara-dhaureya and Kakati-rajya-samartha. Epigraphic evidence suggests that he suppressed rebellions from feudatories and repulsed invasions. The 1218 CE Nattarameshvaram inscription states that Rudra defeated an obscure king named Nagati, forcing him to flee to Kolavenu region. This event happened during the reign of Mahadeva, or shortly after his death. Rudra's Palampet inscription describes how he rescued the Kakatiya kingdom from grave misfortune:

Ganapati was released from Yadava captivity sometime in 1199 CE. The Ramakrishnapuram inscription states that Rudra reinstated Ganapati on the throne.

According to some scholars, such as M. Somasekhara Sarma, Rudra also repulsed an invasion by Kulottunga Chola III. Others, such as P.V.P. Sastry dispute this in absence of concrete evidence.

Palampet 

Rudra established the town of Palampet and commissioned the construction of the Ramappa Temple there, as attested by a 1213 CE inscription. Although Palampet is now a small village, it was an important town during the Kakatiya period. The temple is also called Rudreshvara ("Lord of Rudra"), a word play on the name of the builder (Recherla Rudra) and the deity (Rudra being another name for Shiva).

References

Kakatiya kingdom
12th-century Indian people
13th-century Indian people
Indian generals